Teja Singh was a Sikh scholar, teacher, author and translator.

Teja Singh may also refer to:

Teja Singh Akarpuri, Jathedar of Akal Takht from 1921 to 1923 and 1926 to 1930
Teja Singh Bhuchar, Jathedar of Akal Takht from 1920 to 1921
Teja Singh Samundri, founder of Shiromani Gurdwara Prabandhak Committee
Teja Singh Sutantar, freedom fighter and member of Ghadar Party